Lindy Fralin is a US manufacturer of  "boutique" guitar pickups based in Richmond, Virginia. He got his start in the early 1990s winding by hand on a homemade machine because he was not satisfied with commercially available pickups. After a number of years experimenting with various formulas he found one that improved the tone of standard single coil windings. 

A number of guitar players heard the resulting product and asked him to do the same for their guitars, which led him to establish Lindy Fralin Pickups. The company still winds pickups by hand to the exacting specifications of each customer. J-bass style single coil pickups are remarkable for clarity and high output. They are also known for period correct rewinding of vintage guitar pickups. The company now employs 6 people and ships pickups worldwide.

Fralin also produced pickups for PRS Guitars initially for the EG II model, then continuing to the Custom 22 model.

References

External links 
 Official homepage
 Video Tour of Lindy Fralin's Shop

Guitar pickup manufacturers
Manufacturing companies based in Richmond, Virginia